Anna Clarke (28 April 1919 – 7 November 2004) was a British author of mystery novels popular in the United States and the United Kingdom. The novels belong to a subgenre known as the cosy mystery. Jack Adrian, writing for The Independent, says, "In classic 'cosy' territory the puzzle is all, and the sleuths, of both sexes, tend either to the genteel and spinsterish (variations of Miss Marple from Agatha Christie, and Miss Maud Silver from Patricia Wentworth), or to be fussbudget busybodies with loud, horsy laughs and pushy manners." In many of Clarke's later novels, the sleuth is Paula Glenning, a professor of literature. Glenning has been described as "an intellectual who solves crimes with research, dialogue, and brains rather than muscles and violence."

Clarke began her career as a private secretary for the London publishing firms Victor Gollancz Ltd (1947–50) and Eyre & Spottiswoode (1951–52) and as administrative secretary for the British Association for American Studies (1956–62). She began writing mysteries after a long illness that interrupted her career, and her first success as a crime writer came in 1968, when she was 49 years old.

Born in 1919 in Cape Town, South Africa, she was the daughter of Fred and Edith Gillams Clarke, both educators. Fred Clarke, later knighted, taught in Cape Town, then in Montreal, Canada, and finally in Oxford, England. Interested in economics, Anna Clarke completed a Bachelor of Science degree at London External in 1945. After working for publishing companies, she returned to school, completing a Bachelor of Arts via the Open University in 1973 and a Master of Arts at the University of Sussex in 1975.

Clarke was a member of the British Federation of University Women, the Crime Writers Association, and the Society of Authors. She married David Hackel in 1947, divorced in 1957, and died in 2004.

Bibliography

Mystery novels
 The Darkened Room (1968) 
 A Mind to Murder (1971) 
 The End of a Shadow (1972) 
 Plot Counter-Plot (1974) 
 My Search for Ruth (1975) 
 Legacy of Evil (1976) 
The Deathless and the Dead  (1976) 
This Downhill Path (1977) 
The Lady in Black (1977) 
Letter from the Dead (1977) 
One of Us Must Die (1978) 
The Poisoned Web (1979) 
Poison Parsley (1979) 
Last Voyage (1980) 
Game Set and Danger (1981) 
Desire To Kill (1982) 
We the Bereaved (1982) 
Soon She Must Die (1983) 
Last Judgment (1985) 
Cabin 3033 (1986) 
The Mystery Lady (1986) 
Last Seen in London (1987) 
Murder in Writing (1988) 
The Whitelands Affair (1989) 
The Case of the Paranoid Patient (1991) 
The Case of the Ludicrous Letters (1994) 
The Case of the Anxious Aunt (1996)

Other
As Anna Hackel
Assisted in the translation of Karl Abraham, Clinical Papers and Essays on Psychoanalysis (1955)

References

1919 births
2004 deaths
20th-century English writers
20th-century British women writers
English crime fiction writers
English mystery writers
Women mystery writers
Writers from Cape Town
South African emigrants to the United Kingdom